Vitt is a surname. Notable persons with that surname include:

Ossie Vitt (1890–1963), American baseball player
Dale Hadley Vitt (born 1944), American bryologist and ecologist
Joe Vitt (born 1954), American coach in American Football
Bill Vitt, American musician
Yury Vitt (born 1980), Uzbekistani wrestler